Shayla Lawson is an American poet and writer, currently the writer in residence at Amherst College.

Biography  
Lawson grew up in Kentucky and "set down her roots in its slam poetry scene" before majoring in Architecture at the University of Kentucky, where she gave the 2005 Breathitt Lecture, "My Ancestor Antenna: Hair and Its Relation to African-American Identity Across the Diaspora." After graduating, Lawson worked as an architect for some time before pursuing her MFA at Indiana University, where she worked as the nonfiction editor of the Indiana Review and for the Graduate Mentoring Center. Lawson published her debut collection, A Speed Education in Human Being, in 2013, the chapbook Pantone, of which each poem was printed on its own card, in 2016, and the book I Think I'm Ready to See Frank Ocean in 2018.  She received the 2017 Oregon Literary Fellowship and Honorable Mention in the 2017 Cave Canem Poetry Prize. Lawson succeeded Daniel Hall as the poet in residence at Amherst College beginning in the 2018-19 academic year.

In 2021, Shayla Lawson appeared on Storybound (podcast) reading two excerpts from her book, This Is Major, with music by MAITA.

Awards and honors 

 2020 National Book Critics Circle Award (autobiography), finalist for This Is Major: Notes on Diana Ross, Dark Girls, and Being Dope

Publications  

A Speed Education in Human Being, Sawyer House, 2013.
Pantone, Miel, 2016.
I Think I'm Ready to See Frank Ocean, Saturnalia Books, 2018.
This is Major: Notes on Diana Ross, Dark Girls, and Being Dope, Harper Perennial, 2020.

References 

Living people
Writers from Kentucky
University of Kentucky alumni
Indiana University alumni
21st-century American poets
American women poets
Poets from Kentucky
Year of birth missing (living people)
21st-century American women writers